The Wrocław Fountain —  Wrocław Multimedia Fountain, — , is a multimedia musical fountain and ornamental pond in Wrocław, of western Poland. The fountain runs only during the summer season - from the last weekend of April or the first weekend of May to late October.

Description
The Wrocław Fountain is located in the historic Wrocław exhibition ground. It is next to the early modernist Centennial Hall, and encircled within the Wrocław Pergola.

Built in 2009, it is currently one of the largest operating fountains in Europe.

Multimedia show
The  fountain incorporates over 300 jets to create moving-dancing screens of water. They are used, with music and light, by a computerized multimedia program for animated water shows.

During the day fountain unimpressed. However are spectacular nightly shows. The fountain is illuminated at night by 800 computer programmed coloured lights.

Ice skating
When frozen in winter, the Wrocław Fountain is drained and an   ice skating rink takes some of its space.

Gallery

See also
Sequencing fountain
Centennial Hall (1913) — a modernist UNESCO World Heritage Site.
Index: Fountains in Europe

External links

 Official Wrocław Fountain website — (Wroclawska Fontanna — in Polish, English)
 Official city of Wrocław website: the Wrocław Fountain
 LEDS Magazine — Wrocław Fountain featured
 Wroclaw:Poland:The.Wroclaw.Fountain.Multimedia.Show.html TripAdvisor: "The Multimedia Show"
Videos
  YouTube: Wrocławska Fontanna Multimedialna — multimedia visualization.

References 

Fountains in Poland
F01
Tourist attractions in Wrocław